is a Japanese voice actor affiliated with Stay Luck. After participating in Stay Luck as a workshop student in 2015, she made her debut as a voice actor in 2016. She was inspired by Inuyasha, as well as Hana Nono/Cure Yell in  HUGtto! PreCure.

Filmography

Television series
2016
Hanaipa (Arijiro)
2017
Kirakira Pretty Cure a la Mode (2017-2018, Live Guest / Student, Girl Student, Yapapa, Junko Mitsuoka, Hana Nono/Cure Yell)
Pittanko! Nekozakana (Chinpei, seagull mother, hippo wife, sea turtle boy, old woman)
Princess Principal (Merry Jen)
Soreike! Anpanman (2017-2020, Cat Beauty, Tulip-san, Sisters, Kiiko, Squirrel Girl)
Doraemon (TV Asahi version) (I)
Blood Blockade Battlefront & BEYOND (Children)
2018
Violet Evergarden (Lillian, iris nephew, female)
Fate/Extra Last Encore (girl student)
Hug! Pretty Cure (2018-2019, Nono Hana / Cure Yell)
Hanaipa (Ari Jiro)
Pop Team Epic (Bacon Mushamsha-kun)
Layton Mystery Detective Company: Katry's Nazotoki File (Bredda)
Experimental Family -Creatures Family Days- (Female Caster, Girl)
Cardfight!! Vanguard (2018-2020, Ingaru, Flash Shield Isolde, Schoolgirl, Fan, Poetry Parthenos, etc.)-3 Series
2019
Manaria Friends (Elf Daughter)
Inazuma Eleven Orion's engraving (Che Lin)
One-Punch Man (Female Citizen C)
Ojarumaru (customers, couples)
Dororo (children)
Cop Craft
GO! GO! Atom
2020
Heya Camp (junior high school girls)
The Gymnastics Samurai (Chibikko C, Boy B, Junior Girls C)
2021
Megalobox 2: Nomad  (Miguel)
Blue Reflection Ray (Mio)
To Your Eternity (March)
Yu-Gi-Oh! Sevens (Drone)
Waccha PriMagi! (Chimumu)

Films
2018
Pretty Cure Super Stars! (Hana Nono/Cure Yell)
Hug! Pretty Cure Futari wa Pretty Cure: All Stars Memories (Hana Nono/Cure Yell)
Pretty Cure Miracle Universe (Hana Nono/Cure Yell)
2020
A Whisker Away (Shiori Mizoguchi)
Violet Evergarden (Children)
Burn the Witch (Osushi)
Pretty Cure Miracle Leap: A Mysterious Day with Everyone (Hana Nono/Cure Yell)

Web animation
Anime Puso Boiled Komi (2019-2020 , Tetra) - 2 Series

Video games
2017
Luna Puri (Beryl)
'Thousand Memories (Phirel)Grand Marche Labyrinth (Platinum, Shan)Phantom Beast Princess (Pandora)Quiz RPG Wizard and the Black Cat (2017-2019, Enery Nelly, Rail Stale)Timed Istalia (Sana, Watatsumi)White Cat Project (Kata)Sevens Story (Estea, Dahlia)
2018Tokyo ConceptionPreCure Tsunagaru Pazurun (Hana Nono/Cure Yell)Conquest! Excalibur (Frost, Milledi)Youkai Hyakuhimetan! (Daimaen, Shiramine Daimyojin)Megiddo 72 (Sara)Freezing Extension (Saito Yuma)Princess Connect! Re:Dive (2018-2019 , women, boys, worshipers, Amegami, etc.)Nari Kids Park HUG! Precure (Hana Nono / Cure Yell )
2019Phantasy Star OnlineFighting EX Layer ( Area )
2020Marco and the Galaxy Dragon (Yuko Onda)Olympia Soiree (Camelia)Echoes of Pandora (Caventers)Bleach Brave Souls (Osushi)
2021DC Super Hero Girls Teen Power (Toyman)Granblue Fantasy (Ewiyar)

DubbingThe Rising Hawk'' (Myroslava (Poppy Drayton))

References

External links
 Official website
 

Japanese voice actresses
Living people
People from Kagoshima Prefecture
Year of birth missing (living people)